Tetramorium renae is an ant in the family Formicidae. It occurs in São Tomé and Príncipe. The holotype was collected on São Tomé Island, at 1350 m elevation. It was first described in 2010 by Hita Garcia, Fischer & Peters.

References

Insects described in 2010
renae
Endemic fauna of São Tomé and Príncipe